Sportsworld may refer to:

 Sportsworld (Australian TV series), an Australian sports information program, 1990–2006
 Sportsworld (radio programme), the flagship sports programme of BBC World Service, 1959–present
 Sportsworld (Canada), a news show on sports channel The Score
 Sportsworld (American TV series), an American sports anthology series, 1978–1992
 Sportsworld (magazine), an Indian sports magazine

See also 
 Sports World or Sports Direct, a British sporting goods retailer
 World of Sport (disambiguation)